In 1897 men's basketball is introduced at Michigan State Normal School. The inaugural team went 1–1 in games against Detroit. Both games ended in shutouts. 1897–98 was the first season of basketball at the school, which would become Eastern Michigan University Eagles men's basketball team.

Schedule

|-
!colspan=9 style="background:#006633; color:#FFFFFF;"| Non-conference regular season

References

Eastern Michigan Eagles men's basketball seasons
Michigan State Normal